The Cyclists' Alliance or TCA is the labor organization representing professional cyclists in UCI Women's World Tour (UCIWWT) events. The organisation, which operates out of Ouderkerk aan de Amstel, is led by Executive Director Iris Slappendel.

Details
Founded in 2017, TCA act as an intermediary between members and the businesses that employ them. The main purpose of the organization is to provide formal representations and give riders the power to negotiate for more favourable working conditions.

In addition to conducting labor negotiations, TCA represents and protects the rights of the athletes; the organization's actions include filing grievances on behalf of athletes. The union is also negotiating for the introduction of a collective bargaining agreement as is available for male cyclists. The union will ensure these commitments are adhered to by the UCI and the teams. It negotiates and monitors retirement and insurance benefits and enhances and defends the image of athletes and their profession.

Background
Female professional athletes have been waging a battle for equality in nearly every major sport. The past few years have produced watershed wins. In contrast, cycling had made little progress prior to 2017.

The UCI's 18-member management committee includes only two women and reflects the widespread institutional sexism in cycling culture. In February 2017, Slappendel had spoken to the men's cycling union, the Cyclistes Professionnels Associés (CPA), about ways in which they could support women's cycling. After the men's association dismissed Slappendel, asserting that CPA did not consider women to be professional, a 2017 rider survey affirmed that an association of women's professional cyclists would be an important catalyst to push women's teams, the UCI, and race organizers, to work toward greater economic and career opportunities for women. This came as no surprise to Slappendel and the labor association, The Cyclists’ Alliance, formed.

Initial organising phase
The Cyclists' Alliance as an idea came from the recently retired Iris Slappendel following some of her own experiences as a rider and a UCI representative. The organization began when Slappendel met with two professional cyclists, Gracie Elvin of Mitchelton–Scott and Carmen Small of Team Virtu Cycling Women, and the group surveyed 450 professional cyclists racing in UCI Women's World Tour events.

Leadership
The current executive director of TCA is Iris Slappendel. As of 2018, the rider council consists of the following current athletes: Ashleigh Moolman-Pasio, Amanda Spratt, Leah Kirchman, Ellen van Dijk, Marianne Vos, Audrey Cordon, Christine Majerus, and Ariane Luthi (MTB).

Notes

References

Labor-related organizations
Organizations established in 2017
Organisations based in the Netherlands
2017 establishments in the Netherlands